The office of the Chief Martial Law Administrator was a senior and authoritative post with Zonal Martial Law Administrators as deputies created in countries such as Pakistan, Bangladesh and Indonesia that gave considerable executive authority and powers to the holder of the post to enforce martial law in the country in an events to ensure the continuity of government. This office has been used mostly by military officers staging a coup d'état. On some occasions, the office has been under a civilian head of state.

Pakistan

Some famous holders of this post in Pakistan include:

 Field Marshal Ayub Khan (1958–62): held the post under President Iskander Mirza.
 Lt. Gen. Bakhtiar Rana: held the post of Chief Martial Law Administrator West Pakistan
 General Yahya Khan (1969–71): held the post simultaneously as the President of Pakistan.
 Lt. Gen. Tikka Khan (1969–71): was appointed Chief Martial Law Administrator of West Pakistan in 1969 and of East Pakistan in 1971 by Yahya Khan.
 Lt. Gen. A. A. K. Niazi (1971): was appointed Chief Martial Law Administrator of East Pakistan in 1971 by Yahya Khan.
 Zulfikar Ali Bhutto (1971–73): became the first civilian to hold this post in Pakistan after the Bangladesh Liberation War.
 General Muhammad Zia-ul-Haq (1977–88): held this office under President Fazal Ilahi Chaudhry after overthrowing Prime Minister Bhutto.
 General Pervez Musharraf (1999–2002): held this office under President Rafiq Tarar, although it was styled as "Chief Executive of Pakistan."

Bangladesh
Some famous holders of this post in Bangladesh include:

 Maj. Gen. Khaled Mosharraf (1975): held this post for four days after a bloody Military coup only to be killed in a counter coup led by JSD leader retired Lt. Col. Abu Taher, resuming  Major General Ziaur Rahman's reign.
 Justice Abu Sadat Mohammad Sayem (1975–76): held this post while serving as the fifth president of Bangladesh.
 Maj. Gen. Ziaur Rahman (1976–77): held this post during martial law and until withdrawal of Martial Law and assumed the presidency in 1977.
 Lt. Gen. Hussain Muhammad Ershad (1982): held this post until withdrawal of martial law in 1982–86.

Indonesia
In Indonesia, this post was briefly held by army chief Suharto, who seized power in 1966 and forced President Sukarno to resign in 1967. Sukarno had also enforced martial law during his tenure as President of Indonesia.

See also
 Military coup
 Military regime
 Martial law
 Military coups in Bangladesh

References

External links
 
 Bangladesh (1975-77)
 Martial law in Bangladesh

Heads of government
Government of Bangladesh
Presidents of Bangladesh
Political terminology in Pakistan
Military terminology of Pakistan
Continuity of government in Pakistan
Pakistani military appointments